Trindade (Portuguese meaning Trinity) is a brand of still bottled water in Cape Verde. It is produced by the company Tecnicil Indústria ("Águas de Cabo Verde" before 2008).

References

Food and drink in Cape Verde
Bottled water brands